The 2015–16 Spanish stage of the UEFA Regions' Cup was the 11th staging of this tournament. The winners qualified for the 2017 UEFA Regions' Cup.

Castile and León won their second title.

Competition format
The eighteen teams joined the preliminary round, played as mini-tournaments with three teams in each group, where only the first qualified team will advance to further stages.

The winners of groups A, B, C and D joined the intermediate stage while the winners of the groups E and F directly qualified for the semifinals.

Preliminary stage

Group A

Group B

Group C

Group D

Group E

Group F

Intermediate round
The play-off between Andalusia and Ceuta was played on 27 January and 10 February 2016, while the matches between Asturias and Extremadura were played on 10 and 24 February 2017.

|}

Final stage
The final stage was played on 25 and 27 March 2016 in the Estadio Ciudad de Puertollano, Puertollano, Castile-La Mancha.

Bracket

References

External links
Royal Spanish Football Federation

Spanish stage of the UEFA Regions' Cup
2015–16 in Spanish football cups